Lee James Marshall (born 21 November 1997) is an English footballer who last played as a midfielder for North Leigh.

Playing career
Lee Marshall was first recognised as a youngster at his local Junior School Innsworth in a school football game against Churchdown Village Juniors. Marshall became a scholar at Swindon Town in the summer of 2013. Marshall made his professional football debut as a late substitute in the League Cup First Round tie against Luton Town.

In July 2016, Marshall joined Bath City.

Career statistics

References

External links

1997 births
Living people
English footballers
Association football midfielders
Swindon Town F.C. players
Bath City F.C. players
Swindon Supermarine F.C. players
North Leigh F.C. players
English Football League players